Greene is an unincorporated community in Greene Township, Jay County, Indiana.

History
A post office was established at Greene in 1862, and remained in operation until it was discontinued in 1900. The community was named from Greene Township.

Geography

References

Unincorporated communities in Jay County, Indiana
Unincorporated communities in Indiana